Edith Gillian Harrison (1898–1974), née Cooke, was a British architect.

Early life and education 
After Roedean School, she trained at the Architectural Association School of Architecture from 1917 to 1922, where she was one of the first four female students.

Career 
In 1931 Harrison became the first woman Fellow of the Royal Institute of British Architects. The second woman elected FRIBA was Gertrude Leverkus. 

Harrison designed a house in Kent, England, called 'Red Willows' in 1933. The exact location of Red Willows is in Littlestone, Kent where Cooke and Harrison (architects) designed three other houses for clients: Oberlander, Glukstein, and Paton

Personal life 
In 1923, she married Harry St John Harrison, also an architect. Together they formed a joint practice called Cooke & Harrison. They had one child, a son, Richard.

References

1898 births
1974 deaths
British women architects
20th-century British architects
Alumni of the Architectural Association School of Architecture